Draco cornutus is a species of "flying dragon", an agamid lizard. It is endemic to Borneo.

Description 
The color of the gliding membrane, or patagia, of Draco cornutus depends on the habitat; populations of these lizards have adapted over time to match the color of local falling leaves. This adaptation provides them with camouflage from potential avian predators.

References 

cornutus
Endemic fauna of Borneo
Reptiles of Brunei
Reptiles of Indonesia
Reptiles of Malaysia
Reptiles described in 1864
Taxa named by Albert Günther
Reptiles of Borneo